Segun Adebutu is a Nigerian businessman, economist and philanthropist. He has business interests in oil and gas, shipping, mining, construction, real estate, agriculture and entertainment. He is the chairman and CEO of Petrolex Oil and Gas, a company presently building the second largest refinery in sub-Saharan Africa.

Adebutu is also Chairman of Bluebridge Marine Ltd, Bluebridge Minerals, Oladiran Agro-Allied Company and Oladiran Engineering & Trade Ltd. Segun Adebutu is the founder of Baseline Records Label, who signed on music artists like Skales and Saeon. He is also founder of Trade Nigeria Limited, and is a member of the Board of Premier Lotto, a gaming company based in Nigeria.

Adebutu is founder and financier of the Oladiran Olusegun Adebutu Foundation (OOA), an NGO focused on economic empowerment, health, community investments, philanthropy, vocational enterprise for vulnerable women and children in crisis.

Background
Segun Adebutu is born to the family of Kesington Adebukunola Adebutu, founder and chairman of Premier Lotto Nigeria Limited, who hails from Iperu Remo, Ikenne Local Government, and Caroline Oladunni, from Odogbolu, both in Ogun State, South West Nigeria. Segun Adebutu, graduated in Economics at the University of Ibadan, and started trading in oil and gas in 2004.

Petrolex Oil and Gas Limited 
After starting with oil and gas trading in 2004, Segun Adebutu's ventures grew from small business into a world-class conglomerate with interests in shipping, mining, construction, infrastructure, real estate, telecommunications, and entertainment.

In 2007, Segun Adebutu founded Petrolex Oil & Gas Limited, as a part of Petrolex Group. For ten years, Adebutu quietly and organically nurtured his energy firm, Petrolex Oil & Gas Limited, into a key player in a volatile sector.

According to Segun Adebutu, he started trading small batches of petroleum products, which powered electrical generators in homes and industries across Nigeria. After facing congestion and distribution issues during the initial stages, he concluded that there was a need to create a company to solve the issues at hand. At that time, Storage and Distribution (S&D) seemed to be the best area to evolve into, and also the easiest in terms of capital.

Back then, Segun Adebutu found the ideal place to set up an S&D facility in Ibafo, which is on the border between Ogun and Lagos. After setting the foundation, he started real estate acquisition in 2010 and block construction in 2013, until December 2017, when Segun Adebutu came under the spotlight when he drew massive attention, including from Nigerian Vice President, Prof Yemi Osibanjo, following the announcement of his construction of Sub-Saharan Africa's largest tank farm as a part of his Mega Oil City project in Nigeria. The tank farm is a 300-million litre storage facility with 20 storage tanks.

Back then, it had the capacity to turnover 600 million litres of petroleum products every month, enabling products to be stored and distributed effectively and more efficiently, for better services and higher turnover. At the time of launch, it was expected that the tank farm project would be the largest product storage tank farm in sub-Saharam Africa and would create over 10,000 jobs. The company received its first cargo in Q2 of 2018.

Mega Oil City 
After the conclusion of the first phase of the Mega Oil City, the result was an infrastructure that covers 101 square kilometres, making it Africa's largest petroleum products hub, approximately 10% of the size of Lagos State. The first phase of the project was the Ibefun tank farm in 2018, a US$426 million petroleum products storage facility with a 300-million-litre capacity, making it the largest and first of its kind in sub-Saharan Africa. The City also boasts 30 loading gantries and a 4000-truck capacity trailer park. It also reduced gridlock at the Apapa seaports by 60%.

The industrial complex started the second phase of the project, which is intended to be an investment of US$5 billion into the economy of Ogun State, and will house a 250,000-bpd refinery, a 100 MW power plant, a petrochemical plant, a lubricant plant and a gas processing plant. Adebutu says, "In conformity with our daring ambitions, we have an expansion plan which will increase the storage capacity of the tank farm to 1.2 billion litres in a few years."

Nigeria is Africa's biggest oil-producing nation, but does not have adequate refining capacity and imports at least 70 percent of its needs. A government pledge to end such purchases in the next two years by building local capacity has lured investors including Africa's richest man, Aliko Dangote, who is constructing a 650,000-barrel-a-day refinery. Adebutu has joined Dangote as the only two Nigerians currently building refineries.

Subsidiaries and other activities 
Segun Adebutu is also Chairman of several subsidiaries to Petrolex, among them, Bluebridge Marine Services and Bluebridge Minerals. There is a focus on minerals and bitumen based on current Nigerian laws.

Philanthropy 

In 2014, Adebutu founded Oladiran Olusegun Adebutu (OOA) Foundation, a non-profit and non-political organisation, established and registered with CAC in the year 2014 and based in South West, Nigeria. Since 2014, OOA Foundation has been involved in philanthropic initiatives ranging from educational support, health support, nutritional support, psychosocial support, recreational support, shelter and provision of clean water. It was formally launched on Saturday, 22 October 2016 at Abeokuta, Ogun State, South West Nigeria.

Patrons of the Foundation many of whom graced the occasion and pledged their support for the Foundation include:

 Chief Olusegun Obasanjo (Former President of Nigeria); 
 Dr. Sen. Grace Folashade Bent; 
 former Chief Justice of Nigeria, Hon Justice Salihu Modibo Alfa Balgore; F
 former Minister of Youth and Culture, Alabo Tonye Graham Douglas;

The organization works primarily on the economic empowerment, health, community investments, women and children in crisis in Nigeria. Through the philanthropic work of the Foundation, Adebutu and his team have adopted over 400 vulnerable children. It was also responsible for incubating over 500 youth-led micro-enterprises and setting up pioneering youth entrepreneurship programmes in Lagos and Osun States

Baseline records 
Adebutu founded a record company called Baseline Records, signing Nigerian musicians Skales and Saeon. In 2020, his radio station, Baseline FM, started test-running in Lagos.

Controversy
Nigeria's Premium Times reported that a petition by Western Lotto's owner, Buruji Kashamu, triggered an investigation against rival company Premier Lotto, owned by Segun's father, Kesington Adebutu, Buruji Kashamu is a former politician, Nigerian senator, and U.S. fugitive. It is claimed that Kashamu is the real identity of "Alhaji", the drug kingpin in Piper Kerman's book, Orange Is the New Black: My Year in a Women's Prison, which was adapted in the Netflix hit series Orange is the New Black.

Multiple officials at the lottery commission accused Mr. Kashamu of triggering the investigation because he wanted to dominate a section of the betting business in Nigeria. Following the petition Economic and Financial Crimes Commission (EFCC) started investigating Segun's father's Premier Lotto for tax fraud. Segun Adebutu attended the questioning on his father's company behalf on 28 January 2020. Tony Orilade, chief spokesperson for the EFCC, did not immediately return a request seeking comments on the details of the investigation.

The investigation was summarily dismissed after further clarifications from the company, and the EFCC found no malpractices in the affairs of Premier Lotto and Segun Adebutu. The factual basis of Mr Kashamu's allegations remained unclear at this time as the EFCC is yet to make its findings public.

References

Living people
21st-century Nigerian businesspeople
Yoruba businesspeople
University of Ibadan alumni
Nigerian philanthropists
Yoruba philanthropists
Nigerian company founders
Nigerian businesspeople in the oil industry
Nigerian chairpersons of corporations
1974 births
Nigerian financiers